A Few Cubic Meters of Love (Chand Metre Moka'ab Eshgh) is a 2014 Iranian-Afghan romance film directed by Jamshid Mahmoudi. It was selected as the Afghan entry for the Best Foreign Language Film at the 87th Academy Awards, but was not nominated.

Plot
Abdul Salam is an Afghan immigrant. He is working and living with her daughter Marvena in a workshop.

Cast
 Hasiba Ebrahimi as Marvena
 Saed Soheili as Saber
 Nader Fallah
 Masoud Mirtaheri
 Alireza Ostadi

See also
 List of submissions to the 87th Academy Awards for Best Foreign Language Film
 List of Afghan submissions for the Academy Award for Best Foreign Language Film

References

External links
 

2014 films
2014 romance films
Afghan drama films
2010s Persian-language films
Iranian romance films